Vas was an alternative world musical group which consisted of Persian vocalist Azam Ali and American percussionist Greg Ellis. Vas is frequently compared to the Australian band Dead Can Dance. The band released four full-length albums, and both artists have released a few solo albums and participated in side projects. After the group's last album, Feast of Silence, Ali and Ellis went their own separate ways.

Azam Ali was born in Iran and moved to Los Angeles, California, in 1985, where she began studying the dulcimer-like santur under the guidance of Manoochehr Sadeghi. Greg Ellis was born and raised in Los Gatos, California, where he first learned to play the drums at age twelve. Ellis moved to Los Angeles in 1984 and started work as a percussionist. The two musicians met at UCLA in 1995 after hearing each other perform; they formed Vas shortly thereafter.

List of band members
 Azam Ali (1995–2004) -- vocals, hammered dulcimer, guitar, drums
 Greg Ellis (1995–2004) -- udu, tabla, dumbek, nagara, cymbals, bells, drums, keyboards
 Cameron Stone (2000) -- guitar on In the Garden of Souls

Discography

Albums
 Sunyata Narada World/MCA (1997)
 Offerings Narada World/Virgin/EMI (1998)
 In the Garden of Souls Narada World/Virgin/EMI (2000)
 Feast of Silence Narada World/Virgin/EMI (2004)

Compilation appearances
 Refuge on Earthdance 2CD (1998)
 The Reaper and the Flowers on Asleep By Dawn Issue Two (2004)
 The Next Generation - Narada Sampler
 Narada Film and Television Music Sampler

Side projects
 Niyaz (Azam Ali, Loga Torkian)
 Roseland (Azam Ali, Tyler Bates, Greg Ellis)

External links
 Vas discography on Discogs
 Vas on MySpace

Narada Productions artists
American world music groups
Musical groups established in 1996
American musical duos